Helímenas de Jesús Rojo Paredes (22 April 1926 – 9 April 2021) was a Venezuelan Roman Catholic archbishop.

Rojo Paredes was born in Venezuela and was ordained to the priesthood in 1950. He served as bishop and archbishop of the Roman Catholic Archdiocese of Calabozo, Venezuela, from 1980 to 2001.

Notes

1926 births
2021 deaths
Venezuelan Roman Catholic archbishops
Roman Catholic bishops of Calabozo
Roman Catholic archbishops of Calabozo
Eudist bishops